Monmouth Township is located in Warren County, Illinois, United States. As of the 2010 census, its population was 10,463 and it contained 4,237 housing units.

The township's name commemorates the Battle of Monmouth.

Geography

The city of Monmouth is located in this township.

Demographics

References

External links
City-data.com
Illinois State Archives

Townships in Warren County, Illinois
Galesburg, Illinois micropolitan area
Townships in Illinois